Thanasis (Θανάσης) is a Greek given name, short for Athanasios (Αθανάσιος), which can mean "eternal life" or "immortal".

Notable people with the name Thanasis or Thanassis include:

Thanasis Antetokounmpo (born 1992), Greek basketball player
Thanasis Giannakopoulos (born 1931), Greek businessman
Thanasis Kanoulas (born 1992), Greek football player
Thanasis Kaproulias (born 1980), audio artist who creates noise music under the name of Novi_sad
Thanassis Lefas, 20th and 21st century motorcycle engineer
Thanasis Kolitsidakis (born 1966), Greek former footballer
Thanasis Lightbridge (born 1978), Greek keyboard player and composer, founder of electronica art metal band Dol Ammad
Thanasis Pafilis (born 1954), Greek politician and Member of the European Parliament
Thanasis Paleologos (born 1977), Greek footballer
Thanasis Papakonstantinou (born 1959), Greek singer-songwriter
Thanasis Papazoglou (born 1988), Greek footballer
Thanasis Sentementes (born 1975), Greek footballer
Thanassis Skordalos (1920–1998), Cretan musician
Thanassis Stephopoulos (1928–2012), Greek artist
Thanassis Tsakiris (born 1965), biathlete and cross-country skier
Thanasis Veggos (1927–2011), Greek actor

See also
Who Is Thanassis, a 1969 Greek film
Thanasi Kokkinakis, Australian tennis player